Fernando Sierra (born 23 February 1966) is a Colombian former cyclist. He competed in the team pursuit at the 1992 Summer Olympics.

References

External links
 

1966 births
Living people
Colombian male cyclists
Olympic cyclists of Colombia
Cyclists at the 1992 Summer Olympics
Place of birth missing (living people)
20th-century Colombian people